Mount Dimlang (formerly Vogel peak) is found in the Shebshi mountains in Adamawa State. It is the highest point of the Shebshi Mountains. Its peak reaches a height of about 2,042 m (6,699 ft.), although Google Maps reports its height at being considerably less, around just under 1,700 m.

References

Mountains of Nigeria

BURGER